Rozières-en-Beauce (literally Rozières in Beauce) is a commune in the Loiret department in north-central France.

See also
Communes of the Loiret department

References

Rozieresenbeauce